This article lists events that occurred during 1977 in Estonia.

Incumbents

Events
Development of Tallinn Lasnamäe area begins.

Births
23 February – Kristina Šmigun-Vähi, skier
27 September – Andrus Värnik, javelin thrower
8 December – Maarja Jakobson, actress

Deaths

References

 
1970s in Estonia
Estonia
Estonia
Years of the 20th century in Estonia